The Amman Citadel Inscription is the oldest known inscription in the so-called Ammonite language. It was discovered in 1961 in the Amman Citadel, and first published in full in 1968 by Siegfried Horn. At the time of its discovery it was the third longest Semitic stone inscription ever found in the Southern Levant, after the Mesha Stele and the Siloam inscription. The inscription is known as KAI 307. As of 1969, the inscription was on display at the Jordan Archaeological Museum.

Description
The inscription is carved into a white limestone block of approximately 26 × 19 cm (10′ × 7½′) in size, with parts of the inscription lost. Most letters are clearly visible, and the stone has few traces of erosion and was therefore probably not exposed to the elements.

The inscription contains eight lines. The left and right sides of the inscription are missing parts, and the bottom line does not seem to include the end of the inscription. The top line is thought to be the beginning of the inscription since there is space above it.

In the eight lines, 93 letters are shown, which are interpreted to be spread between about 33 words. The size and shape of individual letters vary considerably, suggesting that the inscription comes from a novice scribe. Numerous letters have unusual shapes, for example the ḥēt has only two cross beams, compared to the usual three, similar to the Mesha stele. The ṭēt is only a crossbar in a circle (instead of the usual ), and the ʿayin is already slightly open upwards ( instead of ), which occurs in Phoenician inscriptions only from the 5th century.

It is understood to be a building inscription, although due to the fragmented nature of the inscription, the translation remains uncertain. The reconstruction by William Fulco assumes that the inscription concerns the Ammonite chief deity Milcom, restoring a single missing letter to form the name.

Text

Bibliography
 
 Cross, Frank Moore (1969). "Epigraphic Notes on the ‘Ammān Citadel Inscription". BASOR 193, pp. 13-19.
 Fulco, William J. (1978). "The ‘Ammān Citadel Inscription: A New Collation". BASOR 230, pp. 39-43.
 Horn, Siegfried (1969). "The Ammān Citadel Inscription". BASOR 193, pp. 2-13.

Websites
 The Amman Citadel Inscription at kchancon.com

References

1961 archaeological discoveries
Archaeological artifacts
Ancient Near East
Inscriptions
KAI inscriptions